was an early and prominent advocate of women's education in Meiji Japan.

Biography
At age six, he was adopted into his maternal line under . He began his education with Nakamura Masanao in 1876 at Nakamura's Dōjinsha school, where he studied English; in 1880 he advanced to Tsuda Sen's Friends School to study agriculture. In 1882 he took up a place at Kimura Kumaji's school to study Christian theology. He was baptized in 1883. 

In cooperation with Kondō Kenzō, Iwamoto started a magazine  which existed only one year in 1884. There, and afterwards, Iwamoto wrote forcefully to advocate changes to Japanese society with respect to women's roles in society. He called for better education for women, the expansion of their civil rights, and for the refoundation of marriage on the basis of love and respect between husband and wife. Still, he held that women's place was in the home—they would be educated to run efficient, hygienic, and economical homes so as to raise intelligent, moral, and service-minded children. 

Publications
女學雜誌, Issues 251-275 (1891)

References

1863 births
1942 deaths
Japanese educators
Japanese Christians
Japanese magazine founders